Geoffroea is a rather small genus of wild spiny shrubs or small trees of tropical and subtropical South America. Although it gathers few species, they are highly extended geographically throughout the subcontinent. Each species is well known in its local area, as seen from the varied (and mostly domestic) usage of these trees as food, timber, or fuel. It was recently assigned to the informal monophyletic Pterocarpus clade within the Dalbergieae.

References

Dalbergieae
Fabaceae genera